Ivan Ivanovich Gorbunov-Posadov (16 [old style: 4] April 1864 - 12 February 1940) was a Russian, Soviet writer, poet, editor and publisher.

An avid Tolstoyan since 1884, Gorbunov-Posadov often served as an intermediary between Tolstoy and contemporary writers, notably Anton Chekhov. Throughout its history he was the key figure at the Posrednik publishing company which he became the head of in 1897.

An advocate of the so-called Free Upbringing (Свободное воспитание) theory, he edited the radical pedagogical journal Svobodnoye Vospitaniye (1909-1918), in which Nadezhda Krupskaya and Vladimir Bonch-Bruyevich were also involved, as well as the Library for Free Upbringing of Children, illustrated by Elisabeth Boehm. In 1907-1918 he published the magazine for children Mayak (Маяк, Beacon).

An ardent pacifist, Gorbunov-Posadov became noted for his passionate anti-war poems, some of which featured in Brothers, Come to Your Senses! 1900-1917 (Опомнитесь, братья!, 1917) and Songs for Brotherhood and Freedom. 1882-1913 (Песни братства и свободы, 1928). In the Soviet times he was credited mostly as a publisher of compilations, book series and illustrated almanacs for children.

References

External links
 The Works by Gorbunov-Posadov at Lib.ru

Writers from the Russian Empire
Editors from the Russian Empire
Poets from the Russian Empire
Writers from Saint Petersburg
1864 births
1940 deaths
Businesspeople from Saint Petersburg